This is a list of microprocessors.

Altera
 Nios 16-bit (soft processor)
 Nios II 32-bit (soft processor)

AMD

 List of AMD K5 processors
 List of AMD Athlon processors
 List of AMD Athlon 64 processors
 List of AMD Athlon XP processors
 List of AMD Duron processors
 List of AMD Opteron processors
 List of AMD Sempron processors
 List of AMD Turion processors
 List of AMD Athlon X2 processors
 List of AMD Phenom processors
 List of AMD FX processors
 List of AMD Ryzen processors

Apollo
 PRISM

ARM
 ARM

Atmel
 AVR32
 AVR

AT&T
 Hobbit

Bell Labs
 Bellmac 32

BLX IC Design Corporation
 Godson/Loongson

Broadcom
 XLS 200 series multicore processor

Centaur Technology/IDT
 WinChip

Cyrix
 486, 5x86, 6x86

Data General
 microNOVA mN601 and mN602
 microECLIPSE

Centre for Development of Advanced Computing
 VEGA Microprocessors

Digital Equipment Corporation
 V-11
 MicroVAX 78032
 CVAX
 Rigel
 Mariah
 NVAX
 Alpha 21064
 Alpha 21164
 Alpha 21264
 Alpha 21364
 StrongARM

Emotion Engine by Sony & Toshiba
 Emotion Engine

Elbrus
 Elbrus 2K (VLIW design)

Electronic Arrays
Electronic Arrays 9002

EnSilica
 eSI-RISC

Fairchild Semiconductor
 9440
 F8
 Clipper

Freescale Semiconductor (formerly Motorola)
 List of Freescale products

Fujitsu 
 FR
 FR-V
 SPARC64 V

Garrett AiResearch
 MP944

Google 
 Tensor processing unit

Harris Semiconductor
 RTX2010

Hewlett-Packard
 Capricorn (microprocessor)
 FOCUS 32-bit stack architecture
 PA-7000 PA-RISC Version 1.0 (32-bit)
 PA-7100 PA-RISC Version 1.1
 PA-7100LC
 PA-7150
 PA-7200
 PA-7300LC
 PA-8000 PA-RISC Version 2.0 (64-bit)
 PA-8200
 PA-8500
 PA-8600
 PA-8700
 PA-8800
 PA-8900
 Saturn Nibble CPU (4-bit)

Hitachi
 SuperH SH-1/SH-2 etc.

Inmos
 Transputer T2/T4/T8

IBM

 1977 – OPD Mini Processor
 1986 – IBM ROMP
 2000 – Gekko processor
 2005 – Xenon processor
 2006 – Cell processor
 2006 – Broadway processor
 2012 – Espresso processor
 2016 – IBM Q processors

POWER
 1990 – POWER1
 1992 – RISC Single Chip
 1993 – POWER2
 1996 – P2SC
 1998 – POWER3
 2001 – POWER4
 2004 – POWER5
 2007 – POWER6
 2010 – POWER7
 2013 – POWER8
 2017 – POWER9
 2020 – Power10

PowerPC-AS
 1995 – A10
 1996 – A25 and A30
 1997 – RS64
 1998 – RS64-II
 1999 – RS64-III
 2000 – RS64-IV

z/Architecture
 2008 – IBM z10
 2010 – IBM z196
 2012 – IBM zEC12
 2015 – IBM z13
 2017 – IBM z14
 2019 – IBM z15
 2021 – IBM Telum

IIT-M
 SHAKTI - Microprocessor & Microcontroller

Intel

 List of Intel Core processors
 List of Intel Core 2 processors
 List of Intel Core i3 processors
 List of Intel Core i5 processors
 List of Intel Core i7 processors
 List of Intel Core i9 processors
 List of Intel Core M processors
 List of Intel Pentium processors
 List of Intel Pentium Pro processors
 List of Intel Pentium II processors
 List of Intel Pentium III processors
 List of Intel Pentium 4 processors
 List of Intel Pentium M processors
 List of Intel Pentium D processors
 List of Intel Celeron processors
 List of Intel Atom processors
 List of Intel Xeon processors
 List of Intel Itanium processors

Intersil
 6100 (12-bit)

ISRO
 Vikram 1601

Lattice Semiconductor
 LatticeMico8 8-bit (soft processor)
 LatticeMico32 32-bit (soft processor)

MIPS Technologies

 R2000
 R3000
 R3000A
 R6000
 R4000
 R4400
 R8000
 R10000
 R12000
 R14000
 R16000
 R18000

MOS Technology
 6502 family

National Semiconductor
 IMP-16
 PACE
 SC/MP
 NSC800
 NS320xx

NEC
 μPD707/μPD708
 μCOM-4
 NEC V20
 NEC V25
 NEC V30/V33
 NEC V40
 NEC V50
 NEC V60/V70/V80
 NEC µPD7220
 NEC µPD96050
 µPD765/µPD765A
 µPD7720/µPD77C25
 µPD780C/µPD780C-1
 R4200
 V850

NVIDIA
 Tegra family

NXP (formerly Philips Semiconductors)
 Signetics 2650

OpenCores
 OpenRISC family

Oracle Corporation (formerly Sun Microsystems)
 SPARC

RCA
 1802

Renesas Electronics
 M32R

RISC-V Foundation
 RISC-V

Sunway
 SW-1 / SW-2 / SW-3 / SW1600 / SW26010

STMicroelectronics
 STM32 series

Tesla
 Tesla D1

Texas Instruments
 Texas Instruments TMS320
 Texas Instruments TMS1000 – used in the TI-35, Big Trak, and Speak & Spell
 Texas Instruments TMS1100 – used in the Microvision
 Texas Instruments TMS3556 - a graphics chip used in the EXL 100
 Texas Instruments TMS7000
 Texas Instruments TMS9900

Toshiba
 Cell
 Toshiba TLCS microcontrollers: TLCS-12, TLCS-48, TLCS-Z80, TLCS-90, TLCS-870, TLCS-900

VIA
 List of VIA microprocessors
 List of VIA C3 microprocessors
 List of VIA C7 microprocessors
 List of VIA Eden microprocessors

Western Design Center
 65C02 (8-bit)
 65816/65802 (16-bit)

Western Digital
 MCP-1600
 LSI-11
 WD16
 Pascal MicroEngine

Western Electric
 WE-32000 (Rebranded Bellmac 32, used in the 3B series computers)

Xilinx
 PicoBlaze 8-bit (soft processor)
 MicroBlaze 32-bit (soft processor)

Zilog
 Zilog
 Z80 architecture
 Zilog Z8000

See also
 List of Intel cores

References

External links
 Microprocessor/Co-processor/Microcontroller families
 Programming Textfiles: Bowen's Instruction Summary Cards